Rosie is a 2013 Swiss drama film directed by Marcel Gisler. It competed in the main competition section of the 35th Moscow International Film Festival.

Cast
 Sibylle Brunner as Rosie
 Judith Hofmann as Sophie Meran
 Louis Krähenbühl as Oberarzt
 Fabian Krüger as Lorenz Meran
 Sebastian Ledesma as Mario
 Anna-Katharina Müller as Chantal

References

External links
 

2013 films
2013 drama films
Swiss drama films
Swiss German-language films